Dr. Michael Perry Gomez (born January 18, 1947) is a Bahamian politician, currently serving as Minister of Health and as member for North Andros & Berry Islands in the House of Assembly of the Bahamas. First elected to the legislature in the 2012 election after defeating Education Minister Desmond Bannister by a margin of 24 votes, he was appointed by Prime Minister Perry Christie to be Minister of Health.

Early life

Gomez was born on New Providence and graduated from the University of the West Indies with a degree in medicine in 1971.  He then attended medical school at Wayne State University where he specialized in Internal Medicine and Infectious Diseases.

Career

Gomez is known globally for his work on HIV/AIDS research, being the founder and director of the National HIV Programme of the Bahamas.  Under his direction, the Programme had a major impact on decreasing the spread of the disease. HIV transmission rates in the Bahamas declined by more than 30 percent and HIV transmission from mother-to-child also decreased dramatically. Seventy-two percent of all persons with advanced HIV receive requisite treatment and all persons with HIV and TB co-infection receive full treatment for both conditions.

Electoral history

Notes

Living people
1947 births
Government ministers of the Bahamas
Progressive Liberal Party politicians
Members of the House of Assembly of the Bahamas
Wayne State University alumni
People from New Providence